Lac La Belle is a village located mostly in Waukesha County in the U.S. state of Wisconsin. The population was 281 at the 2020 census. The village is located mostly within the town of Oconomowoc in Waukesha County. On March 28, 2002, the village annexed a portion of land in the town of Ixonia in Jefferson County.

Geography
Lac La Belle is located at  (43.145460, -88.525757) in the "Lake Country" area of Waukesha County.

Demographics

2010 census
As of the census of 2010, there were 290 people, 115 households, and 97 families living in the village. The racial makeup of the village was 98.6% White, 0.3% Asian, 0.3% from other races, and 0.7% from two or more races. Hispanic or Latino of any race were 0.3% of the population.

There were 115 households, of which 25.2% had children under the age of 18 living with them, 80.0% were married couples living together, 4.3% had a female householder with no husband present, and 15.7% were non-families. 13.0% of all households were made up of individuals, and 9.6% had someone living alone who was 65 years of age or older. The average household size was 2.52 and the average family size was 2.77.

The median age in the village was 53.8 years. 21% of residents were under the age of 18; 2.1% were between the ages of 18 and 24; 13.8% were from 25 to 44; 41.8% were from 45 to 64; and 21.4% were 65 years of age or older. The gender makeup of the village was 49.0% male and 51.0% female.

2000 census
As of the census of 2000, there were 329 people, 117 households, and 109 families living in the village. The population density was 484.1 people per square mile (186.8/km2). There were 127 housing units at an average density of 186.9 per square mile (72.1/km2). The racial makeup of the village was 99.70% White, 0.30% from other races. Hispanic or Latino of any race were 0.30% of the population.

There were 117 households, out of which 35.9% had children under the age of 18 living with them, 84.6% were married couples living together, 9.4% had a female householder with no husband present, and 6.0% were non-families. 3.4% of all households were made up of individuals, and 1.7% had someone living alone who was 65 years of age or older. The average household size was 2.81 and the average family size was 2.88.

In the village, the population was spread out, with 22.8% under the age of 18, 4.6% from 18 to 24, 24.6% from 25 to 44, 37.1% from 45 to 64, and 10.9% who were 65 years of age or older. The median age was 44 years. For every 100 females, there were 91.3 males. For every 100 females age 18 and over, there were 91.0 males.

The median income for a household in the village was $96,712, and the median income for a family was $100,000. Males had a median income of $89,119 versus $39,375 for females. The per capita income for the village was $46,749. About 2.7% of families and 1.8% of the population were below the poverty line, including 2.5% of those under age 18 and none of those age 65 or over.

Education
All portions of Lac La Belle are in the Oconomowoc Area School District. Oconomowoc High School is the local high school.

Recreation
Lac La Belle is home to Wisconsin's second oldest 18-hole golf course, La Belle Golf Club (www.labellegolfclub.com)
. Originally called Lac La Belle, it opened in 1896.

The village is also home to Camp Olin-Sang-Ruby Union Institute (OSRUI), a Union for Reform Judaism summer camp.

References

External links
 Village of Lac La Belle official website

Villages in Jefferson County, Wisconsin
Villages in Waukesha County, Wisconsin
Villages in Wisconsin